Jesse Yu Joy Yin (born 8 October 2001) is a Hong Kong professional footballer who currently plays as a midfielder for Hong Kong Premier League club Rangers.

Club career
In August 2021, Yu joined Rangers.

International career
On 14 June 2022, Yu made his international debut for Hong Kong in the Asian Cup qualifiers against India.

Career statistics

International

References

External links
 Yu Joy Yin on the Hong Kong Football Association website

2001 births
Living people
Hong Kong footballers
Hong Kong international footballers
Association football midfielders
Happy Valley AA players
Hong Kong Rangers FC players
Hong Kong Premier League players